Charles Edward Files (May 19, 1883 – May 10, 1954) was an American baseball pitcher with the Philadelphia Athletics during the  Major League Baseball season. A Maine native, Files was born in Portland and died in Cornish. He is buried in Riverside Cemetery in Cornish. He attended Bowdoin College.

References

Major League Baseball pitchers
Philadelphia Athletics players
Baseball players from Maine
Bowdoin Polar Bears baseball players
Sportspeople from Portland, Maine
1883 births
1954 deaths
Reading Pretzels players
Holyoke Papermakers players
Providence Grays (minor league) players
burials in Maine